Thermia can refer to the following : 

 Places and jurisdictions 
 Thermeia, a village in Cyprus
 the popular and historical name of the Greek island of Kythnos, in the Cyclades (Aegean Greece)
 the Latin Catholic bishopric of Thermia, 17th century name of the former Roman Catholic Diocese of Ceo (now titular see of Cea), covering both Cycladic islands
 the Greek Orthodox eparchy (diocese) on the above island 

 Biology
 Thermia (gastropod), genus of land snails